Iron Man: The Armored Avenger is a toy line manufactured by Hasbro, composed mainly of 3" scale action figures but will also feature a line of 6" figures. This is a continuation of the Iron Man 2 toy line under a different name, due to the company no longer marketing the film. Like the previous line, it will include a mix of movie-based, comic-based, and concept figures.

The line falls under Hasbro's "Avengers Assemble" marketing banner, which will also include the Thor: The Mighty Avenger and Captain America: The First Avenger toy lines, both of which are based on their upcoming films.

Action Figures - 6" Legends Series
This is a line of 6" figures designed to fit with the Marvel Legends toy line which is being relaunched in 2012.

Wave 1 - February 2011

Wave 2 - March 2011

Wave 3 - TBD 2011

Hasbro products
Marvel Comics action figure lines
2010s toys